Alvin Hankerson (November 23, 1923 – June 30, 1995), better known as Guitar Nubbit, was an American blues guitarist and singer. His most notable song was "Georgia Chain Gang", which was originally released in 1962 as a single on Bluestown Records.

He was the uncle of the folk music singer and autoharp player Dorris Henderson.

Life and career
Henderson was born in Fort Lauderdale, Florida. During a hurricane when he was three years old, he lost the tip of his right thumb, which led to his lifelong nickname, Nubbit (sometimes shortened to Nub). He spent most of his formative years in Georgia and then relocated to Boston, Massachusetts, in 1945. He attempted to teach himself to play the guitar, but after a year of trying he gave up the instrument in 1949. However, by 1954, he could afford guitar lessons and enlisted Bill Bryant, a former music teacher from Rocky Mount, North Carolina, to teach him. Guitar Nubbit eventually mastered the rudiments of the instrument. He then performed locally, playing and singing mainly his own compositions, whilst maintaining his daytime job as a barber.

In 1962, Guitar Nubbit recorded his first tracks for the small Bluestown Records label. His first single release was "Evil Woman Blues" backed with "Laura", which was recorded in his adopted hometown of Boston. This was swiftly followed by his most noteworthy song, "Georgia Chain Gang", backed with "Hard Road". He recorded further tracks the same year, and in Ipswich, Massachusetts, in 1963, but most of these were unreleased for years. His 1965 release of "Big Leg Woman" was a cover version of Blind Boy Fuller's song. The releases sparked some interest in a mainly white audience, during the so-called blues revival from the late 1940s to the 1960s. His offerings lacked variety, and despite some exposure in his local folk scene, he drifted into obscurity. Various attempts were made to revive his fortunes, including an EP released in 1971 by XX Records, but all the numbers contained on that disc were from the previous decade. A rather unusual seven-track, 12-inch 45-rpm record entitled Re-Living the Legend! was released in 1989. The compilation album Blues Town Story, Vol. 1, released by Wolf Records in 1998, includes a couple of previously unreleased tracks; one side of the disc includes work by an even more obscure bluesman, Alabama Watson.

Guitar Nubbit died in June 1995, aged 71, in Boston.

Discography

Singles and EPs

Compilation albums

References

External links
Discogs.com entry

1923 births
1995 deaths
American blues guitarists
American male guitarists
20th-century American singers
20th-century American guitarists
20th-century African-American male singers
African-American guitarists
Songwriters from Florida
Musicians from Fort Lauderdale, Florida
20th-century American male singers
African-American songwriters
American male songwriters